PWD may refer to:

Aviation 
 Sher-Wood Airport, in Montana, United States
 PAWA Dominicana, flag carrier of the Dominican Republic from 2015 to 2018

Government and military 

 Petroleum Warfare Department, of the British Government during World War II (WWII)
 Philadelphia Water Department, a public utility in the northeastern United States
 Psychological Warfare Division, an Anglo-American WWII military unit

Science and technology 
 pwd, in computing, a Unix command
 Phosphoglucan, water dikinase, a phosphorus transferase enzyme
 Wilson disease protein, a P-type ATPase enzyme

Sport 
 Plymouth and West Devon Football League, England (founded 2004)
 Public Works Department cricket team, Pakistan (1964–2003)

Other uses 
 Parkway Drive, an Australian metalcore band (formed 2003)
 People with disabilities, those chronically impaired physically or intellectually
 Portuguese Water Dog, a dog breed